Trachelissa is a genus of beetles in the family Cerambycidae, containing the following species:

 Trachelissa maculicollis (Audinet-Serville, 1834)
 Trachelissa pustulata (Audinet-Serville, 1834)
 Trachelissa rugosipennis (Gounelle, 1911)

References

Trachyderini
Cerambycidae genera